Łapy-Kołpaki  is a village in the administrative district of Gmina Łapy, within Białystok County, Podlaskie Voivodeship, in north-eastern Poland.

References

Villages in Białystok County